Ini Dima-Okojie (born 24 June 1990) is a Nigerian actress from Edo State, Nigeria. She resigned from her job in investment banking to enroll at the New York Film Academy. She started her career with the first television appearance on Taste of Love and she has featured on many films including the multicultural romcom, Namaste Wahala in 2021 and the Netflix Nigerian original thriller, Blood Sisters (2022 series) in 2022.

Early life and education 
Dima-Okojie is from Esan North-East LGA, Edo State, Nigeria. Her father is a medical doctor and her mother is a retired banker and entrepreneur. She attended Air Force primary school in Lagos and moved to Air Force comprehensive secondary school, Ibadan. She studied at  Covenant University, Nigeria, where she earned a degree in International Relations. She quit her job in investment banking to pursue a pathway into acting. This led her to earn a degree in acting from the New York Film Academy.

Career 

2013 – 2017

Dima-Okojie resigned, from her job in the finance industry to pursue a career in entertainment. Her career in Nollywood started as a production assistant on the film Before 30 and she went on to make her acting debut when she played "Feyisayo Pepple" in the television series, Taste of Love. In 2016, she played "Hadiza Ahmed" in the film North East; her character was that of a Muslim lady who began a romantic relationship with a man from a different religious background. For her role in the film, she was nominated for Best Actress in a Supporting Role at the 2017 Nigeria Entertainment Awards. Dima-Okojie was also nominated for Most Promising Actress at City People Movie Awards around the same time. She was nominated for The Future Awards Africa in 2017.

In 2016, she played the role of Hadiza in a web series by Ndani TV, Skinny Girl in Transit. She also featured in 5ive, It's her day, and North East in the same year.

In 2017, she featured in Battleground and The Royal Hibiscus Hotel She was nominated for The Future Awards prize for acting. She appeared on Pulse Nigeria's list of the 7 Nollywood actresses of 2017.

2018 – 2021

In 2018 she starred in two movies, Sylvia where she played Gbemi Ogunlana in a story based on a fiction of spirit lovers. Later that year, she was cast in Funke where she played the role of Ms. Catherine starring Jide Kosoko, Eniola Badmus, Segun Arinze and directed by Yemi Morafa. The story which was set in 1996 was centred on a young girl's ultimate dream to become a footballer and her struggle to surmount gender roles inherent in her community. In 2018, her outfit to Heineken Lagos fashion week was featured in British and Germany Vogue.

In 2019, she was featured in a role as Laitan Gesinde on the web TV series Oga Pastor directed by renowned movie director and filmmaker Daniel Oriahi. The series was later pulled down by Ndani TV

In 2020, she starred as Tami in the series, Smart Money Woman, an adaptation from a book of the same title by Arese Ugwu. Also in 2020, Who's the boss, featured Dima-Okojie as Jumoke, a best friend to Liah played by Sharon Ooja.

In 2021 She featured in the Netflix original – Namaste Wahala. A multicultural romantic-comedy feature film where she played the role of Didi.

2022

In 2022, she starred in the Netflix Original series, Blood Sisters playing the lead role of Sarah, produced by Ebonylife Studios which is owned by Mo Abudu.  The premiere was well attended by Nollywood stars

Personal life 
She is the last of four children - two sisters and one brother. Her parents are both devoted Catholics, her father a retired Air Commodore in the Nigerian Air force and a military-trained doctor. Her mother is a licensed lawyer who worked in the banking sector. Dima-Okojie is also noted to have a strong fashion sense, with Pulse Nigeria and other media outlets describing her as one of the most stylish celebrities in Nigeria.  Dima-Okojie has cited Majid Michel and Richard Mofe-Damijo as her favourite Nollywood actors.

In December 2020, she opened up on her Instagram page about her struggle and journey with Uterine fibroid from 2017

In 2021, she announced her engagement to Abasi Ene-Obong, the owner of 54Gene. They tied the knot in May 2022. and received number of nollywood actors and actresses at the wedding.

Filmography

TV shows

Films 

TV Host

Production

Awards and nominations

Gallery

See also
 List of Nigerian actresses

References

External links 
 

Living people
1990 births
Actresses from Lagos
Actresses from Edo State
Nigerian television actresses
Actresses in Hindi cinema
Covenant University alumni
New York Film Academy alumni
21st-century Nigerian actresses
Nigerian film actresses